Mahendra Singh Patel is an Indian politician, who was a member of the 16th Legislative Assembly of Uttar Pradesh of India. He represents the Rohaniya constituency of Uttar Pradesh and is a member of the Samajwadi Party political party.

Early life and education
Mahendra Singh Patel was born in Varanasi district. Before being elected as MLA, he used to work as an agriculturist.

Political career
Mahendra Singh Patel has been a MLA for one term. He represented the Rohaniya constituency and was elected during the by-election in 2014.

Posts held

See also
Government of India
Politics of India
Rohaniya
Samajwadi Party
Uttar Pradesh Legislative Assembly

References 

Samajwadi Party politicians
Uttar Pradesh MLAs 2012–2017
People from Varanasi district
1968 births
Living people